The Elk Point Group is a stratigraphic unit of Early to Middle Devonian age in the Western Canada and Williston sedimentary basins. It underlies a large area that extends from the southern boundary of the Northwest Territories in Canada to North Dakota in the United States.

Lithology
The formations of the Elk Point Group are composed primarily of carbonate rocks (dolomite and limestone) and evaporitic rocks (halite, anhydrite and potash), with lesser amounts of dolomitic mudstone and shale.

Paleontology
Some of the carbonate formations of the Elk Point Group contain rich assemblages of marine invertebrate fossils, including many species of brachiopods, gastropods, bivalves, cephalopods, crinoids, ostracods and corals. The evaporitic formations are unfossiliferous or contain a few spores and algal remains.

Environment of Deposition
The formations of the Elk Point Group were deposited in a marine embayment that stretched from an open ocean in the present-day Northwest Territories of Canada to North Dakota in the United States, covering an area roughly half as large as that covered by today's Mediterranean Sea. At times of low water levels and excessive evaporation, halite and other evaporite minerals were deposited in sabkha, supratidal flat and coastal lagoon environments, and at times of higher water levels carbonate platform sedimentation and reef growth were dominant.

Distribution and Thickness
The Elk Point Group extends from the southern boundary of the Northwest Territories through northwestern British Columbia, Alberta, Saskatchewan, and southwestern Manitoba in Canada, and continues into eastern Montana and North Dakota in the United States.

Stratigraphy
The Elk Point Group was named for the town of Elk Point, Alberta by J.R. McGehee in 1949. Core from a well that was drilled near Elk Point has been designated as the type section (Anglo-Canadian Elk Point No. 11, 2-11-57-5W4). The group is subdivided into the Lower and Upper Elk Point Group, each of which is further subdivided into formations according to the dominant lithologies, as shown in the tables below.

The Lower Elk Point Group comprises all strata lying below the Winnipegosis Formation (in the south) or the Keg River Formation (in the north) and is present only in the deepest parts of the basin. The Upper Elk Point Group, which is present throughout the basin, includes those formations and all overlying formations to the base of the Manitoba Group (in the south) or the Beaverhill Lake Group (in the north).

Subdivisions
In northern Alberta and central Alberta, the Elk Point Group contains the following subdivisions, from top to base:

In southern Alberta
The Elk Point Group is dolomitic and is not differentiated. 

In Saskatchewan, Manitoba and Montana

Relationship to Other Units
The Elk Point Group is conformably overlain by the Manitoba Group in Manitoba and Saskatchewan, and by the Beaverhill Lake Group in Alberta. It rests unconformably on Precambrian basement rocks in northern Alberta, on Cambrian strata in northeastern Alberta and in Saskatchewan, and on Ordovician to Silurian formations in western Alberta, Saskatchewan and southwestern Manitoba. In the  Northwest Territories, some of its uppermost units are exposed at surface or are unconformably overlain by Cretaceous strata.

The Lower Elk Point Group is equivalent to the Stone Formation and its equivalents, and the Headless and Nahanni Formations, in northerneastern British Columbia and the southwestern Northwest Territories. In the same areas, the Upper Elk Point includes the Pine Point Group, and is equivalent to parts of the Horn River Formation, Besa River Formation, and others.

Petroleum and Natural Gas
The porous carbonate rocks of the Elk Point Group host major petroleum and natural gas reservoirs. As of 1994, the Initial Established Recoverable Petroleum Reserves and the Cumulative Petroleum Production for the group were estimated at 339.3 and 240.4 million cubic metres, respectively.  For natural gas, the Initial Established Marketable Reserves and the Cumulative Production were estimated at 142.7 and 79.5 billion cubic metres, respectively.

References

Geologic groups of the United States
Geologic formations of Canada
Oil-bearing shales in Canada
Oil-bearing shales in the United States
Western Canadian Sedimentary Basin
Devonian Alberta
Devonian British Columbia
Devonian Montana
Devonian North Dakota
Devonian Northwest Territories 
Devonian Saskatchewan
Geologic groups of Montana
Geologic groups of North Dakota
Stratigraphy of Alberta
Stratigraphy of British Columbia
Stratigraphy of Saskatchewan
Devonian System of North America
Devonian southern paleotropical deposits
Lower Devonian Series
Middle Devonian Series
Devonian southern paleotemperate deposits